Bryushinina is a rural locality (a village) in Leninskoye Rural Settlement, Kudymkarsky District, Perm Krai, Russia. The population was 1 as of 2010.

Geography 
Bryushinina is located 3 km south of Kudymkar (the district's administrative centre) by road.

References 

Rural localities in Kudymkarsky District